Sona Chandi is a classic comedy-drama television serial produced 48 episodes but released only 32 episodes by PTV . The story of the drama, written by Munnu Bhai, revolves around a couple who comes to a city in search of work so that they can pay off their debts. The role of Sona is played by TV actor Hamid Rana and Chandi (Sheeba Hassan). This simple, innocent couple while performing their domestic-help jobs in different homes, end up helping many people in solving their problems.

Play's background and inspiration
The play was inspired by a real couple named Sona (male) and Chandi (female) from Kallurkot, a Tehsil city of Bhakkar District of Punjab, Pakistan. Munnu Bhai (the writer of the play) who was educated in Kallurkot during his father's posting there as the railways station master of North Western Railway (British India) in the city before 1947, has mentioned his inspiration of these roles in his numerous interviews. Sona is still alive and lives in Kallurkot. During one of his visits to Kallurkot a few years back, Munnu Bhai got to meet the real Sona which is portrayed in the 1983 film version of the same play 'Sona Chandi' (1983).

The credit of its popularity goes to the whole team: Munnu Bhai's script, direction by Rashid Dar and the performances by the actors especially the leading characters of this PTV drama – Sona and Chandi.

Lead characters
 Sheeba Hassan as Chandi
 Hamid Rana as Sona
 Ghayyur Akhtar as Bhai Hameed
 Mama Yaqoob
 Tashfeen as Baji Rukhsana
 Munir Zareef as Chacha karmoo
 Atiya Sharaf as Massi Barkate
 Munna Lahori as Diver of Nawab Farasat Ali Khan

Guest appearances
 Khursheed Shahid as Mehtab Begum 
 Asim Bukhari as Shams
 Farooq Zameer as Abbas Ali Khan
 Durdana Butt as Kako Dhoban
 Arifa Siddiqui as Choti Bibi
 Tauqeer Nasir as Popa
 Neelofar Abbasi as Begum Akhtar
 Aurangzeb Laghari as Bao Naseeb
 Tamanna Begum as Ruqaya
 Faryal Gohar as Zaib
 Jamil Fakhri as Munawar
 Sajjad Kishwer as Tafazzal
 Abid Kashmiri as Ghafoor
 Talat Siddiqui as Begum Abbas Ali
 Shakila Qureshi as Pinky
 Ismat Tahira as Hameeda
 Masood Akhtar as Chaudhry Afzal
 Najma Mehboob as Frasat Ali Khan's mother
 Muhammad Sharif as Basheer

References

External links
Sona Chandi on IMDb website

1980s Pakistani television series
Pakistani television sitcoms
Pakistani drama television series
Pakistani comedy television series
Pakistan Television Corporation original programming